Mosud Mannan (born 21 April 1961) is a diplomat of the People's Republic of Bangladesh. As of 22 October 2020, he is serving as the Ambassador of Bangladesh to the Republic of Turkey. Previously, he served as Ambassador of Bangladesh to the Republic of Uzbekistan, concurrently accredited to the Islamic Republic of Afghanistan, the Republic of Kazakhstan and the Kyrgyz Republic from 16 September 2013 till 15 October 2020.

From 31 March 2010 till 17 February 2013, he was Ambassador to the Federal Republic of Germany, with concurrent accreditation to the Republic of Austria, the Czech Republic, Hungary, the Slovak Republic and the Republic of Slovenia. During his tenure, he was a representative of Bangladesh before the International Tribunal for the Law of the Sea in the dispute concerning delimitation of the maritime boundary between Bangladesh and Myanmar in the Bay of Bengal (Bangladesh/Myanmar). Prior to his appointment in Berlin, Mannan was Bangladesh's Ambassador to the Kingdom of Morocco, with concurrent accreditation to the Republic of Mali, the Federal Republic of Nigeria, the Republic of Senegal and the Republic of Sierra Leone.

Earlier in his diplomatic career, he served in various capacities in Bangladesh Missions in Beijing (Minister & Deputy Chief of Mission), New York City (Counsellor-Minister), Muscat (Counsellor) and London (Second Secretary-Counsellor). From 2000-2001, Mosud Mannan served as Counsellor at the Bangladesh Permanent Mission to the United Nations and was an Alternative Representative of Bangladesh to the Security Council, as the country was elected as a non-permanent member of the Security Council at the time.

References

1961 births
Living people
Ambassadors of Bangladesh to Germany
National Defence College (Bangladesh) alumni
The Fletcher School at Tufts University alumni
University of Dhaka alumni